Joaquín Beltrán Vargas (born 29 April 1977) is a Mexican former professional footballer who played as a defender. He last played for Querétaro F.C. in 2010.

Beltran has spent most of his career with Pumas UNAM. He debuted on 24 November 1996 for Pumas UNAM against Morelia, where Pumas team won 3–2.

After contract negotiations failed with Pumas, he was signed by Necaxa for the Apertura 2006 tournament. He was signed by Cruz Azul for the start of the 2007 Apertura tournament.
In the 2009 Draft he was signed by Querétaro F.C. as a free agent.

Honours
UNAM
Mexico Primera División: Clausura 2004, Apertura 2004

External links

1977 births
Living people
Mexican people of Spanish descent
Mexico under-20 international footballers
Mexico international footballers
Club Universidad Nacional footballers
Club Necaxa footballers
Cruz Azul footballers
Querétaro F.C. footballers
Liga MX players
Footballers from Mexico City
Association football defenders
Mexican footballers